The Primetime Emmy Award for Outstanding Lead Actress in a Drama Series is an award presented annually in the U.S. by the Academy of Television Arts & Sciences (ATAS). It is given in honor of an actress who has delivered an outstanding performance in a leading role on a television drama series for the primetime network season.

The award was first presented at the 6th Primetime Emmy Awards on February 11, 1954. The acting awards presented during the inaugural years were not genre-specific, with actresses in either drama or comedy series receiving nominations and awards. While Eve Arden was the first winner in the female acting category, Loretta Young was the first actress to win for a lead performance in a drama series. By 1966, the acting awards were split into drama and comedy categories, undergoing several name changes until settling with the current title.

Since its inception, the award has been given to 36 actresses, with 31 winning for performances in a drama series. At four awards, Tyne Daly and Michael Learned hold the record for most wins in the category. Angela Lansbury is the most nominated actress in the category, with twelve nominations, though she has never won the award. In 2015, Viola Davis became the first African-American woman to win the award, for her performance as Annalise Keating on How to Get Away with Murder. Zendaya is the current, as well as youngest, recipient of the award for her work on Euphoria.

Winners and nominations
Listed below are the winners of the award for each year, as well as the other nominees.

1950s

1960s

1970s

1980s

1990s

2000s

2010s

2020s

Programs with multiple wins

6 wins
 Cagney & Lacey (consecutive)

3 wins
 The Loretta Young Show
 Mission: Impossible (consecutive)
 Picket Fences (2 consecutive) 
 The Sopranos
 The Waltons (2 consecutive)

2 wins
 China Beach
 The Crown
 Damages
 Euphoria
 Father Knows Best
 The Good Wife
 Hazel
 Homeland (consecutive)
 Thirtysomething
 The West Wing

Programs with multiple nominations

12 nominations
 Cagney & Lacey
 Murder, She Wrote (consecutive)

9 nominations
 The Sopranos

8 nominations 
 Law & Order: Special Victims Unit

7 nominations
 ER
 Killing Eve
 L.A. Law

6 nominations
 Hill Street Blues
 House of Cards
 The Loretta Young Show
 Mad Men
 The Waltons

5 nominations
 The Closer
 The Crown
 Family
 Homeland
 Six Feet Under

4 nominations
 Alias
 Chicago Hope
 China Beach
 Dallas
 Damages
 Fame
 The Good Wife
 How to Get Away with Murder
 Mission: Impossible
 The Mod Squad
 Picket Fences
 The X-Files
 The West Wing

3 nominations
 The Americans
 The Big Valley
 Brothers & Sisters
 The Donna Reed Show
 Downton Abbey
 The Handmaid's Tale
 Hazel
 I Love Lucy
 Lassie
 Orphan Black
 Our Miss Brooks
 Ozark
 Police Woman
 The Rockford Files
 Sisters

2 nominations
 The Avengers
 The Beverly Hillbillies
 Charlie's Angels
 CSI: Crime Scene Investigation
 The Dick Van Dyke Show
 Dr. Quinn, Medicine Woman
 Dynasty
 Empire
 Euphoria
 Father Knows Best
 Fireside Theatre
 Friday Night Lights
 The George Burns and Gracie Allen Show
 Harry's Law
 Hart to Hart
 Here Come the Brides
 I'll Fly Away
 Judging Amy
 McMillan & Wife
 Medium
 The Morning Show
 Nurse
 Once and Again
 Private Secretary
 Saving Grace
 Scandal
 Thirtysomething
 Touched by an Angel
 The Trials of Rosie O'Neill
 Upstairs, Downstairs
 Westworld

Performers with multiple wins

4 wins
 Tyne Daly (3 consecutive)
 Michael Learned (2 consecutive)

3 wins
 Barbara Bain (consecutive)
 Kathy Baker (2 consecutive)
 Edie Falco
 Loretta Young

2 wins
 Glenn Close (consecutive)
 Claire Danes (consecutive)
 Dana Delany
 Sharon Gless (consecutive)
 Susan Hampshire (consecutive)
 Allison Janney 
 Julianna Margulies 
 Barbara Stanwyck 
 Sela Ward 
 Patricia Wettig (consecutive)
 Jane Wyatt
 Zendaya

Performers with multiple nominations

12 nominations
 Angela Lansbury (consecutive) 

8 nominations
 Sharon Gless
 Mariska Hargitay 
 Michael Learned
 Julianna Margulies
 Elisabeth Moss

6 nominations
 Tyne Daly
 Claire Danes
 Edie Falco
 Robin Wright
 Loretta Young

5 nominations
 Glenn Close
 Veronica Hamel
 Kyra Sedgwick

4 nominations
 Debbie Allen
 Gillian Anderson
 Kathy Baker
 Frances Conroy
 Viola Davis
 Dana Delany
 Jill Eikenberry
 Jennifer Garner
 Allison Janney
 Christine Lahti
 Peggy Lipton
 Sandra Oh
 Barbara Stanwyck
 Sada Thompson

3 nominations
 Barbara Bain
 Barbara Bel Geddes
 Lorraine Bracco
 Amy Brenneman
 Connie Britton
 Jan Clayton
 Jodie Comer
 Susan Dey
 Angie Dickinson
 Michelle Dockery
 Sally Field
 Laura Linney
 Tatiana Maslany
 Keri Russell
 Sherry Stringfield
 Sela Ward

2 nominations
 Patricia Arquette
 Kathy Bates
 Joan Blondell
 Olivia Colman
 Roma Downey
 Claire Foy
 Susan Hampshire
 Marg Helgenberger
 Taraji P. Henson
 Holly Hunter
 Kate Jackson
 Swoosie Kurtz
 Jean Marsh
 Stefanie Powers
 Diana Rigg
 Susan Saint James
 Jane Seymour
 Regina Taylor
 Kerry Washington
 Patricia Wettig
 Evan Rachel Wood
 Jane Wyman
 Jane Wyatt
 Zendaya

Notes

See also
 Critics' Choice Television Award for Best Actress in a Drama Series
 Golden Globe Award for Best Actress – Television Series Drama
 Primetime Emmy Award for Outstanding Lead Actor in a Drama Series
 Primetime Emmy Award for Outstanding Lead Actress in a Comedy Series
 Screen Actors Guild Award for Outstanding Performance by a Female Actor in a Drama Series 
 TCA Award for Individual Achievement in Drama

References

Lead Actress - Drama Series
 
Emmy Award